The Ministry of Development Planning was a ministerial department of the Government of Spain that existed between 1973 and 1976 during the dictatorship of Francisco Franco to prepare, promote and monitor the execution of the Economic and Social Development Plans that were enforced throughout the period known as the Spanish miracle. Its first officeholder was Laureano López Rodó.

References

Defunct departments of the Spanish Government
Ministries established in 1973
1973 establishments in Spain
1976 disestablishments in Spain